Day of the Covenant may refer to:
 Day of the Vow, a public Christian holiday in South Africa
 Day of the Covenant (Baháʼí), a holy day for the Baháʼí Faith